The 22nd World Cup season began in November 1987 in Italy and concluded in March 1988 in Austria.  The overall champions were Pirmin Zurbriggen and Michela Figini, both of Switzerland. Zurbriggen won his third overall title; Figini her second.

Beginning this year, the limitation on the number of events that would count for overall and discipline championships, which had been present since the founding of the World Cup, was eliminated.  The intent was to eliminate ties for discipline titles, although the first tiebreaker (number of wins) was retained; additionally, this would permit skiers to accumulate more points toward the overall title from their strongest disciplines.

A break in the schedule in February was for the 1988 Winter Olympics in Calgary, Alberta, Canada.  The alpine events were held at the new Nakiska ski area.  As the Olympics was in the process of eliminating its prior ban on professionals being allowed to compete, Swedish star Ingemar Stenmark returned to the Olympics after having been banned in 1984 (although Stenmark still received his payments from sponsors at his Monaco address, not through the Swedish federation).  Accordingly, from this point forward, skiers were able to turn professional and still continue to compete in the World Cup, which caused the demise of the former professional skiing circuit within a decade.

Calendar

Men

Ladies

Men

Overall 

see complete table

In Men's Overall World Cup 1987/88 all results count. Pirmin Zurbriggen won his third Overall World Cup. The two parallel slaloms did not count for the Overall World Cup.

Downhill 

see complete table

In Men's Downhill World Cup 1987/88 all results count.

Super G 

see complete table

In Men's Super G World Cup 1987/88 all four results count. Pirmin Zurbriggen won the cup without a single race-win. All events were won by a different racer.

Giant Slalom 
see complete table

In Men's Giant Slalom World Cup 1987/88 all results count.

Slalom 

see complete table

In Men's Slalom World Cup 1987/88 all results count. Alberto Tomba was able to win six races out of eight.

Combined 

see complete table

In Men's Combined World Cup 1987/88 both results count.

Ladies

Overall 

see complete table

In Women's Overall World Cup 1987/88 all results count. The two parallel slaloms did not count for the Overall World Cup.

Downhill 

see complete table

In Women's Downhill World Cup 1987/88 all results count. Michela Figini won her third Downhill World Cup. Swiss athletes were able to win all races.

Super G 

see complete table

In Women's Super G World Cup 1987/88 all four results count.

Giant Slalom 

see complete table

In Women's Giant Slalom World Cup 1987/88 all results count.

Slalom 

see complete table

In Women's Slalom World Cup 1987/88 all results count. Every race saw a different winner.

Combined 

see complete table

In Women's Combined World Cup 1987/88 both results count.

Nations Cup

Overall

Men 

All points were shown. But without parallel slaloms, because result ? (Also possible, that the parallel slaloms were only show-events.)

Ladies 

All points were shown. But without parallel slaloms, because result ? (Also possible, that the parallel slaloms were only show-events.)

References

External links
FIS-ski.com - World Cup standings - 1988

FIS Alpine Ski World Cup
World Cup
World Cup